Thomas Cowan (born 21 April 1969) is a Scottish football journalist and radio presenter who was previously also a television presenter.

Early life
He was educated at Braidhurst High School in Motherwell where he was one of the school captains.

Career
Cowan presented Scottish football comedy TV show Offside. He has also taken to live stand-up comedy by taking "Offside" to the stage in 2002. The show was recorded live at the King's Theatre in Glasgow for DVD. 

In February 2010, Cowan presented It's Never Too Late, a six-part documentary series for STV on literacy and numeracy difficulties among adults. Cowan was also a guest presenter for STV's overnight interactive strand The Nightshift and rejoined the station on 20 September 2011 as a main co-presenter for the lifestyle magazine show The Hour, alongside Michelle McManus. The programme was axed four weeks after a move to a weekly prime time slot and a revamp of the programme led to low ratings.

For 16 years, Cowan was a restaurant critic and reviewer, and additional columnist, with the Daily Record newspaper. He moved to their rival newspaper, The Scottish Sun, in March 2014.

Cowan presents the comedy football radio show Off the Ball on BBC Radio Scotland, along with Daily Record and Sunday National journalist and good friend Stuart Cosgrove. Cowan was temporarily dropped from Off the Ball in 2013 for sexist remarks made about women's football in his Daily Record column.

Personal life
Cowan is a well known fan of Motherwell F.C. He and his wife, Liz, have a daughter.

Filmography
Television

Radio

References

External links 
 Tam Cowan at The Daily Record
 

1969 births
Living people
People from Motherwell
People educated at Braidhurst High School
Scottish radio personalities
Scottish television presenters
Scottish sportswriters
Scottish columnists
Scottish women columnists
British women television presenters
Scottish women writers
British restaurant critics